Jeff Altman (born August 13, 1951) is an American stand-up comedian and actor who has appeared as a guest on Late Night with David Letterman and Late Show with David Letterman a combined 45 times. Altman mesmerized contemporaries like David Letterman and Jerry Seinfeld, and inspired future comedians like Judd Apatow.

Altman has also had numerous acting roles in movies and television such as Dr. Gene Splicer in Tiny Toon Adventures, Professor Dweeb in Slimer and The Real Ghostbusters, Clint Mullet on Mork and Mindy, and five different guest characters on Baywatch. He had a recurring role as Hughie Hogg, the nephew of Jefferson Davis Hogg, on The Dukes of Hazzard.

Early life and education
Altman was born in Syracuse, New York, to Genelle, a housewife, and Arthur, a sales manager. At Nottingham Senior High School in Syracuse, he played third singles on the school's tennis team and was on the wrestling team. He graduated from Johns Hopkins University in 1974 with a degree in social sciences.

Career
Altman began his career in 1974 at the Comedy Store.

In 1976, came his first appearance on television, on Cos, a Bill Cosby children's variety show . A year later he joined Starland Vocal Band Show, where he was alongside celebrities such as David Letterman and Mark Russell. In 1978 he appeared as sleazy record promoter Lennie Richfield in the movie American Hot Wax. Altman also had a starring role as the host of the short-lived NBC variety show Pink Lady and Jeff in 1980, which TV Guide has ranked No. 35 on its "50 Worst TV Shows of All Time" list.
Altman appeared on the first episode of An Evening at the Improv.

Later in the decade, he became the in-house comedian on Solid Gold, where his characters included Al Punker, fast-talking proprietor of "Al Punker's Music Barn," the "music vampire Count Downula," and the ex-boxer Leonard Moon, the last of whom would state "I don't have the brains of a ice cube" and claim, "I am the Solid Gold music critic. Tonight, my subject is music."

Altman has directed many sitcoms. In the mid-1980s, he was the spokesman for Arby's restaurants, Tostitos corn chips, and Valvoline motor oil, and by 1990 he was a Budweiser spokesman.

In 1982, he appeared in a movie, Send in the Clowns.

In 1989, Altman released his one and only comedy record album, titled "I'll Flip You Like A Cheese Omelette" (Mercury 842 070-1) and the same year had appeared in three Hollywood clubs: the Laugh Factory, the Comedy Store and the Irvine Improvisation. He also has been the (uncredited) host of the defensive driving course available through Blockbuster Video.

In the 1990s, Altman was on the NBC series Nurses during its first season (1991–1992). He was written out as the show was re-worked for its second season.

A regular feature of his stand-up act has typically included a comical impression of his father, and Altman continued to find his Nixon impression humorous well into the 1980s. In 1991 he was a host of The Sunday Comics, but later was replaced by Lenny Clarke. On February 22, 1991, Altman had created his own show called Jeff Altman's Scrap Book, where he continued to parody his "Dad" as Uncle Carl which he started back in early 1980s.

In 2017, Jeff Altman played a fundraiser, at the Chicago branch of the Laugh Factory, for McCormac College of Lake View, Chicago.

Altman and Letterman
Altman met Letterman in 1975 at the Comedy Store in Hollywood. After a few dinners and even attending Indianapolis 500 together, they became great friends. During one such outing, a woman, who was a huge Letterman fan, had approached them and asked if Altman could take a picture of her and Letterman, using her camera. As they posed and Altman was lining up the shot, he suddenly broke away and ran, pretending to steal the camera. Since that time, Jeff Altman appeared on Late Night with David Letterman and Late Show with David Letterman a combined 45 times.

Personal life
Altman is a drummer, and a longtime fan of Buddy Rich, whom he once enticed to appear at Hopkins for one of his classes. In 1979 he married Leslie Ackerman and together they had a daughter, Faith.

Altman is also an accomplished magician. A much admired "card man," one of his effects has been included in the famous Tarbell Course in Magic.

Filmography

Film

Television

References

External links

Comedians site biography

1951 births
Living people
Jewish American comedians
Jewish American male actors
American stand-up comedians
American male comedians
American male television actors
American male film actors
Johns Hopkins University alumni
Male actors from New York (state)
Male actors from Syracuse, New York
Comedians from New York (state)
People from Syracuse, New York
20th-century American comedians
21st-century American comedians
Tau Epsilon Phi